Sir John Ini Lapli GCMG, (baptised 25 June 1956) was the Governor-General of the Solomon Islands from 7 July 1999 until 7 July 2004.

Prior to his election as Governor-General in June 1999, Lapli was Premier of Temotu Province. He was taken hostage by rebels in 2000, but released after a few days, when the Prime Minister and his government promised to resign. In June 2004 Lapli failed to be re-elected to the position of Governor-General for another 5-year term, receiving only 6 of the 41 votes in Parliament.

References

1956 births
Living people
Solomon Islands Anglican priests
Knights Grand Cross of the Order of St Michael and St George
Governors-General of Solomon Islands
People from Temotu Province
Solomon Islands Anglicans